SouthCoast Wind is a  proposed offshore wind farm in U.S. federal waters about 30 miles south of Martha’s Vineyard and 23 miles south of Nantucket, Massachusetts with an name plate capacity of 804 MW in Lease OCS-A 0521, which covers 127,388 acres. Construction is expected to start in the mid 2020s. 

The project is a joint venture between Shell Renewables and Energy Solutions (formerly New Energies) and Ocean Winds (a global offshore wind collaboration of Engie and EDP Renewables).  Fugro conducted a high‑resolution Geo‑data acquisition project in the lease area and along the export cable routes. Ventoline will advise on construction and cabling. Bladt Industries and Semco Maritime will construct the offshore substation.

In early 2023, authorities approved a Power Purchase Agreement at 7c/kWh, however contracters viewed the agreement as insufficient.

It will connectto the grid at the former Brayton Point Power Station.

Project

See also
List of offshore wind farms
List of offshore wind farms in the United States
Vineyard Wind
Cape Wind
East Coast of the United States
Territorial waters

References

External links 
Mayflower Wind
Ocean Winds
Shell

Wind farms in Massachusetts
Proposed wind farms in the United States
Offshore wind farms in the United States